The John Worsfold Medal is an Australian rules football award presented annually to the player(s) adjudged the best and fairest at the West Coast Eagles throughout the Victorian Football League/Australian Football League (VFL/AFL) season.

Sixteen individual players have won the West Coast best and fairest since the award was introduced for West Coast's inaugural 1987 season. The record of the most Club Champion Awards by an individual player is four which is held by Glen Jakovich and Ben Cousins. Both players also share the record for the most consecutive best and fairests, having both won three consecutive awards.

The Club Champion Award was renamed the John Worsfold Medal in 2013, after former premiership-winning captain and coach John Worsfold.

Voting procedure
Various procedures have been used by the match committee to determine the club champion:

 1987: unknown
 1988: unknown
 1989–2001: The match committee collectively award three votes to the best player, two votes to the second-best player and one vote to the third-best player in each match.
 2002–04: Each member of the match committee rates every player to a maximum of five votes for each match.
 2005–13: Each member of the match committee rates every player on a 5–4–3–2–1 basis for each match.
 2014–present: Each member of the match committee rates every player to a maximum of three votes for each match.

Recipients

Multiple winners

References
General

Specific

Australian Football League awards
West Coast Eagles
Awards established in 1987
Australian rules football-related lists
|}